Motojuku Station may refer to these train stations in Japan:
Motojuku Station (Aichi), in Aichi Prefecture
Motojuku Station (Gunma), in Gunma Prefecture